William G. Tapply (July 16, 1940 – July 28, 2009) was an American writer who published over 40 works. He is best known for his legal mystery series featuring lawyer and detective Brady Coyne, and he also wrote about one of his favorite pastimes, fishing.

Tapply was born, raised, and lived in New England. He was a high school teacher and a college professor.

Early life and education
Tapply was born in Waltham, Massachusetts, and raised in Lexington by his father, H.G. Tapply, and his mother, Muriel. Tapply's father wrote the column "Tap's Tips" for Field & Stream.

Tapply graduated from Lexington High School. He earned a bachelor's in American studies from Amherst College in 1962 and received a master's in teaching from Harvard.

Career
Tapply published over 40 books in his 25-year career. Over half of his books featured lawyer detective Brady Coyne in a mystery series. Tapply also published essays and books about fishing, and, like his father, wrote for Field & Stream. In addition to his non-fiction about fishing, Tapply published a short series of mysteries in which the protagonist was a Maine fishing guide.

Tapply's first Coyne mystery, Death at Charity's Point, was published in 1984. Tapply described Coyne as "a lawyer with Brahmin clients who always wanted to keep the police out of it." Coyne, like his creator, was an avid trout fisherman. Writing about Tight Lines (1992), one of the Coyne mysteries, a reviewer said, "Brady is as appealing a character as ever". Reviewing Scar Tissue (2003), the 17th Coyne mystery, a critic stated: "Like a well-worn, comfortable pair of shoes or a favorite old college sweat shirt, William G. Tapply and Brady Coyne just don't disappoint."

Tapply also wrote other kinds of fiction, including The Nomination, his last novel, published after his death. One reviewer described The Nomination as a "fascinating political thriller".

Before becoming a full-time writer, Tapply was a school teacher and administrator at his alma mater, Lexington High School. He also taught at Emerson College and was an English professor at Clark University in Worcester, Massachusetts. According to the owner of Kate's Mystery Books in Cambridge, Massachusetts, Tapply "helped young writers a lot and was a wonderful teacher." Tapply wrote The Elements of Mystery Fiction (2004), a book that describes the process of writing and publishing mysteries.

Tapply's final Coyne mystery, Outwitting Trolls, was published in 2010, a year after his death.

Honors
Death at Charity's Point (1984), Tapply's first mystery novel, won the Scribner Crime Novel Award.

Personal
Tapply was married to editor and mystery writer Vicki Stiefel and had five children. Tapply met Stiefel at a writer's group in 1992. Stiefel said that Tapply "helped a lot with my writing. He's a terrific teacher."

Tapply died on July 28, 2009, from leukemia at his farm in Hancock, New Hampshire.

References

External links
Tapply's website

1940 births
2009 deaths
20th-century American novelists
21st-century American novelists
American crime fiction writers
American male novelists
American thriller writers
Amherst College alumni
Clark University faculty
Harvard Graduate School of Education alumni
People from Hancock, New Hampshire
People from Waltham, Massachusetts
Novelists from Massachusetts
Novelists from New Hampshire
Lexington High School alumni
20th-century American male writers
21st-century American male writers
20th-century American non-fiction writers
21st-century American non-fiction writers
American male non-fiction writers